Stackhousia pubescens, commonly known as downy stackhousia, is a species of plant in the family Celastraceae.

The species is found from the Mid West, Wheatbelt, South West, Great Southern and Goldfields-Esperance regions of Western Australia.

References

pubescens
Plants described in 1834